is the debut studio album by Japanese band Flower Flower, released on November 26, 2014.

Background and development 

Flower Flower was first formed in early 2013. It was the second musical project of vocalist Yui, who originally debuted as a solo artist in 2005. After five studio albums, Yui announced her intention to retire from music as a soloist after the release of her two greatest hits albums in December 2012. The band started with recording sessions, followed by a series of secret lives across Japan in March 2013. The project was officially announced in April 2013, followed by a series of festival performances. The group released their first single "Tsuki" digitally in June.

Two more songs were released from the album as digital singles: "Kamisama", a stock song from their setlists, was released on May 21, while  "Subarashii Sekai" was released on October 1. The cover artwork for "Subarashii Sekai" would later grace the cover of the album itself, despite being released before the album's announcement.

Writing and production 

The album was recorded at various recording studios in Tokyo. All songs featured lyrics written exclusively by Yui, however most of the songs were composed by the band as a single entity. Three songs were composed solely by Yui: "Tōmei na Uta", "Ohayō no Kiss o" and "Kimi no Koto". Yui felt that with Flower Flower, they could make any sound they wanted, but with Mi the strongest feeling she had was of destruction. The song "Kamisama" was the first song where Yui played the electric guitar.

The booklet and cover artwork were designed by Coa Graphics, and featured illustration by artist Natsuko Fujii.

Promotion and release 

In June 2013 the song "Tsuki" was used in a commercial campaign for cellphone provider au, which featured Yui personally as the spokesperson appearing in the advertisements. The song "Subarashii Sekai" aired as the TV Tokyo drama Tamagawa-ku of the Dead'''s theme song, which started airing on October 3, 2014.

The album was first announced on October 22. Tracks from the album were released on a weekly basis in the build up to the album's release. The first song was "Tōmei na Uta" released on October 29, followed by "Kūki" on November 5, "Kimi no Koto" on November 12 and "Byebye" on November 19.

 Critical reception 

Music magazine Musica featured three reviews of the album. Tohbo Sakuma felt that much of the album had a live music sound, and that the release had the feel of rock and roll, even though it was not in that genre. Akinori Yamamoto of the band Lite felt that Flower Flower was a project that shifted the focus of Yui's music away from the melody, and towards the entire composition of the songs. He noted most of the songs featured messages, and felt that the album was "serious and reassuring". Daichi Yajima noted the strong emotive quality of Yui's voice in the album's songs.

Both Sakuma and Yajima praised "Hikari", with Sakuma feeling it was one of the most memorable songs on the album due to its shoegazing sound, Yui's "floating" vocals, and its message of facing up against absurdity in the world. Yamamoto singled out the song "Start Line" as having one of the most special compositions of the album. Yajima also singled out the song "Seki o Tatsu" for the "uneasy atmosphere" created by the song's "inorganic keyboard phrases".

 Track listing 

Personnel
Personnel details were sourced from Yankees liner notes booklet.Performance creditsMafumafu – bass
Mura Jun – keyboards, programming
Sacchan – drums
Yui – vocals, guitarTechnical and production'''

Flower Flower – arrangement, production
Uni Inoue – recording, mixing
Shigeo Miyamoto – mastering
Kunio Nishikawara – pre-production engineer
Jun Watanabe – assistant engineer

Chart rankings

Sales

Release history

References 

2014 debut albums
Japanese-language albums
Sony Music Entertainment Japan albums